"FYI" is a common abbreviation of "for your information". The term, originally a wire service abbreviation used by journalists, is commonly used in email, instant messaging and other messages to indicate an informational message or explanatory statement not suggesting any action, or requiring a response. The abbreviation is also commonly used in spoken conversations.

Use of "FYI" has been attested from 1915, as "just a little thing that saves space on a telegraph message" (charged by the word).

Among Internet Standards, FYIs are a subset of the Request for Comments (RFC) series. The FYI series of notes is designed to provide Internet users with a central repository of information about any topics which relate to the Internet.  FYI topics may range from historical memos on  "Why it was done that way" to answers to commonly asked operational questions.

References

Initialisms